Jet Express Airlines LLC is a small airline based in Kazan and Moscow, Russia. It operates charter flights for VIP passengers.

Fleet 
, the Jet Express Airlines fleet included the following aircraft:

References

Charter airlines of Russia